As is an Austronesian language spoken on the north coast of the Doberai Peninsula, Indonesian New Guinea, but originally from Gag Island.

References

South Halmahera–West New Guinea languages
Languages of western New Guinea